Victoria Koronowo is a football club based in Koronowo, Poland. They play in the A-Klasa Bydgoszcz (7th level).

External links
 Official club website 
 Victoria Koronowo at the 90minut.pl  website 

Association football clubs established in 1971
1971 establishments in Poland
Bydgoszcz County
Football clubs in Kuyavian-Pomeranian Voivodeship